Street Fighter II': Rainbow Edition is an unofficial hacked version of the 1992 2D fighting game Street Fighter II: Champion Edition released in 1992 and developed and published by Taiwanese hacking group Hung Hsi Enterprise Taiwan.

Overview

The game adds many features to the Street Fighter II: Champion Edition gameplay that were not present in the official game. These include Ryu and Ken being able to use their special move Hadouken five times in quick succession (with the ability to score a combo if more than one connects with the opponent), Guile's Sonic Boom able to home in on the opponent, and many special moves being able to be done in the air. Players are also able to press the start button to change their character mid-match. The game also plays at a higher speed. 

Despite many Street Fighter fans' claims that these changes to the gameplay replaced all the skill involved with luck and button mashing, the game proved to be a cult favorite. According to USGamer, a rumor states that Capcom developed Street Fighter II: Hyper Fighting due to the popularity of Street Fighter II: Rainbow Edition as players have noted similarities in gameplay between the two titles. According to an interview on Polygon, James Goddard who did Design Support on Turbo said development on Turbo started after he played Rainbow Edition and told Capcom they had to do an update to compete.

References

Unauthorized video games
1992 video games
Arcade video games
Arcade-only video games
Street Fighter
Video games developed in Taiwan